Plan B typically refers to a contingency plan, a plan devised for an outcome other than in the expected plan.

Plan B  may also refer to:

 Plan B, a brand name of levonorgestrel, an emergency contraception drug

Film and television
 Plan B Entertainment, a film production company 
Plan B Productions, a motion picture company
Plan B (2009 film), an Argentinean film by Marco Berger
Plan B (2019 film), a Kenyan-Nigerian film by Lowladee
Plan B (2021 film), an American comedy film
Plan B (2017 TV series), a Canadian French-language television drama series
Plan B (2023 TV series), a Canadian English-language television drama series adaptation of the 2017 series
"Plan B" (Veronica Mars), a 2006 episode of the TV series Veronica Mars
"Plan B" (30 Rock), an episode of the TV series 30 Rock
"Plan B" (The Vampire Diaries), an episode of the TV series The Vampire Diaries

Music

Plan B (musician) (born 1983), British rapper, musician and film director (alias Ben Drew)
Plan B (duo), a Puerto Rican reggaeton duo
Plan B (Huey Lewis and the News album), 2001
 Plan B (Scorn album), 2002
 "Plan B" (song), a song by Megan Thee Stallion
 "Plan B", a song from the album Too-Rye-Ay by Dexys Midnight Runners
 Plan B, the debut album by the experimental post-hardcore band A Lot Like Birds

Published media
 Plan B (magazine), a monthly music magazine
 Plan B 2.0: Rescuing a Planet Under Stress and a Civilization in Trouble, a 2006 book by Lester R. Brown
Plan B (novel), a 1993 novel by Chester Himes
Plan B, a novel set in the Liaden universe
Plan B, a 2005 novel by Emily Barr

Other
 Plan B free agency, a concept in the National Football League
 Plan B Skateboards, a skateboarding company
 Plan B Advertising Agency, advertising agency
 Plan B Toys, a company based in Ohio, United States
 Plan B (charity), a British climate litigation organisation, also known as 'Plan B. Earth'

See also
 B (disambiguation)